Greatest Hits Live is the third live album by the punk rock band the Ramones. It was released in 1996 on Radioactive Records.

Background
The album was recorded at The Academy in New York City on February 29, 1996.

Its final two songs are bonus studio tracks that are covers, neither of which appeared on a Ramones album previously. "R.A.M.O.N.E.S." is originally by Motörhead, from the group's album 1916; the song was written as a tribute to the Ramones. The other is "Anyway You Want It", originally by The Dave Clark Five. Some editions do not feature the studio tracks. Two versions of the "R.A.M.O.N.E.S." cover song were recorded; one version that features Joey Ramone singing, and another version that features C.J. Ramone singing, which had previously been released as a bonus track on some editions of ¡Adios Amigos!.

The album's packaging features still shots from the video of the band's cover of the Spider-Man theme song. More still shots are featured in the booklet.

Track listing

Omitted tracks from show:
"Teenage Lobotomy"
"Psycho Therapy"
"I Believe in Miracles"
"Gimme Gimme Shock Treatment"
"Rock 'n' Roll High School"
"The KKK Took My Baby Away"
"Commando"
"Somebody Put Something in My Drink"
"California Sun"
"Wart Hog"
"Cretin Hop"
"R.A.M.O.N.E.S."
"Today Your Love, Tomorrow the World"
"Pinhead"
"I Just Want to Have Something to Do"
"Anyway You Want It"
"Love Kills"
"Chinese Rock"
"Havana Affair"

Personnel
Ramones
Joey Ramone – lead vocals
Johnny Ramone – guitar
C. J. Ramone – bass guitar, lead vocals on "Strength to Endure", "Cretin Family" and "The Crusher", co-lead vocals on "53rd & 3rd"
Marky Ramone – drums

Charts

References

Ramones live albums
1996 live albums